WGBZ may refer to:

 WGBZ (FM) , Ocean City, Maryland — current holder of the call sign since June 2021; a relay of WGTS
 WAIV , Cape May, New Jersey — used the callsign WGBZ in 2000 and again from 2013 to 2021
 WFZX , Anniston, Alabama — used the callsign WGBZ from 2011 to 2012
 WNJH , Cape May, New Jersey — used the callsign WGBZ from 2000 to 2007
 WAKZ , Youngstown, Ohio — used the callsign WGBZ from 1980 to 1982